{{safesubst:#invoke:RfD||2=Super Famicom Box|month = March
|day =  2
|year = 2023
|time = 15:09
|timestamp = 20230302150952

|content=
REDIRECT Super Nintendo Entertainment System

}}